Black Diamond is a census-designated place (CDP) in Citrus County, Florida, United States. The population was 1,101 at the 2010 census, up from 694 in 2000.

Geography
Black Diamond is located north of the geographic center of Citrus County at  (28.911262, -82.492608). It is bordered to the north by Pine Ridge, to the east by Beverly Hills and Pine Ridge, and to the south by Lecanto. County Road 491 (North Lecanto Highway) forms the eastern edge of the CDP, leading northeast  to U.S. Route 41 and south  to State Road 44 in Lecanto.

Demographics

Census
As of the census of 2000, there were 694 people, 248 households, and 212 families residing in the CDP. The racial makeup of the CDP was 94.09% White, 0.72% African American, 4.61% Asian, and 0.58% from two or more races. Hispanic or Latino of any race were 1.01% of the population.

Households
There were 248 households, out of which 15.3% had children under the age of 18 living with them, 84.7% were married couples living together, 0.8% had a female householder with no husband present, and 14.5% were non-families. 11.7% of all households were made up of individuals, and 4.0% had someone living alone who was 65 years of age or older.  The average household size was 2.23 and the average family size was 2.39.

Age averages
In the CDP the population was spread out, with 9.7% under the age of 18, 1.4% from 18 to 24, 10.7% from 25 to 44, 39.0% from 45 to 64, and 39.2% who were 65 years of age or older.  The median age was 62 years. For every 100 females, there were 81.2 males.  For every 100 females age 18 and over, there were 81.7 males.

Incomes
The median income for a household in the CDP was $107,771, and the median income for a family was $105,987. Males had a median income of $0 versus $32,500 for females. The per capita income for the CDP was $53,621.  About 5.7% of families and 3.7% of the population were below the poverty line, including none of those under the age of eighteen or sixty-five or over.

Education
The CDP is served by Citrus County Schools. Residents are zoned to Central Ridge Elementary School. Residents are divided between Citrus Springs Middle and Crystal River Middle. Portions of the CDP are zoned to Crystal River High School and Lecanto High School.

References

External links
 Florida Gated Community

Census-designated places in Citrus County, Florida
Census-designated places in Florida